DB AutoZug GmbH was a German rail transport company that provided automobile (Motorail) and night passenger train services for Deutsche Bahn AG.  It was based in Dortmund and was a wholly owned subsidiary of Deutsche Bahn AG. On 30 September 2013 the company was merged into DB AG's long-distance division DB Fernverkehr.

Night trains were operated with the sister company CityNightLine AG (headquartered in Zurich, Switzerland); until CityNightLine AG merged with DB NachtZug. DB AutoZug GmbH and CityNightLine were subsidiaries of DB Fernverkehr AG which in turn was a wholly owned subsidiary of DB Mobility Logistics AG. DB AutoZug GmbH was also responsible for the car transporter trains from Niebüll - Westerland, known as the SyltShuttle, as well as the Schifffahrt und Inselbahn Wangeroogeshipping (Island railway of Wangerooge).

History

Background
The first car transported by rail in Germany was carried by the Deutsche Reichsbahn on 1 April 1930. At first only the rich and privileged could afford cars and the market was small. In the 1950s, Britain and France started to run car transporter trains. In the Summer of 1956, the first true car train in Germany ran, via Hamburg, Munich and also Ostend; the drivers travelled in a passenger car, whilst their automobile was carried by the same train. The German economic recovery in the 1960s brought an increase in travel and a corresponding increase in the number of cars transported, increasing eightfold to 80,000 by 1969, many holiday makers travelling to warmer more sunny parts of Europe. The numbers of cars transported peaked in 1973, at 185,550 vehicles; the oil crisis put an end to this growth. In 1978, the Bundesbahn cut back by 40% its number of terminals due to a lack of demand. The increase in car ownership in the 1980s did little to help the rail-car transporter business - changes in lifestyle meant that people often expected to drive their cars all the way to their holiday destination (which represented most of the car by rail business). Additionally, the seasonal nature of the business meant that buying new wagons was not profitable. In this decade the number of people flying over to a holiday overtook those travelling by rail. Also in this decade, the transport of caravans and boats also ceased. After the merger of the Deutsche Bundesbahn and the Deutsche Reichsbahn - in 1996 a new company was formed: DB AutoZug.

Company history and operations
Created in 1997 the DB brand AutoZug was responsible for the companies' private car transportation business. In 1999 the night trains of the Deutsche Bahn including the brands UrlaubsExpress and DB NachtZug also came under the company's control. From 2002, the organisation became DB AutoZug GmbH, and a company in its own right.

From 1 January 2003 the Euro Night and D-night trains were the responsibility of DB AutoZug GmbH.

In December 2007 DB NachtZug and UrlaubsExpress were branded together under the new name CityNightLine. At the same time, the number of car-trains was reduced by around 1200 to approximately 920, and four of the nine terminals were closed.

2008 brought the procurement of new-car wagons to replace some of up to 40 years old. 2007, the company transported 183,000 vehicles and generated with a turnover of 60 million euros.

For holiday travel by car, the market share of the company was less than 0.5 percent, 70% of the customers were regulars, a quarter were pensioners. Statistically, customers had an above average income.

By the 2008 holiday season, further changes in service were made: the terminal in Troisdorf Germany closed, and services to Livorno (Italy), Fréjus (France) and Rijeka (Croatia) no longer in operation, however in Alessandria (Italy) a new terminal came into operation.

Other services

Night trains

Comprising the former UrlaubsExpress and DB NachtZug and the 'EuroNight' and 'D-Nacht' services.

Wangerooge Island Railway

DB AutoZug GmbH was also the controlling company for the SyltShuttle and the railway on the North Sea island of Wangerooge.

SyltShuttle
The SyltShuttle is a car transporting service to the Island of Sylt which is connected to the mainland by the Hindenburgdamm causeway, a man made construction carrying rail tracks but no road.

DB Autozug terminals

Germany

As of 2009 there are seven car/rail terminals in Germany

Rest of Europe
As of 2009 the European terminals were:

See also 
 Motorail

References

Main sources
Schifffahrt und Inselbahn Wangerooge Shipping and Railway of Wangerooge Island. DB company website. siw-wangerooge.de
CityNightLine Company website citynightline.ch
DB AutoZug Company website autozug.de
DB AutoZug SyltShuttle Company website syltshuttle.de

External links

Deutsche Bahn
Rail freight transport in Germany
Passenger rail transport in Germany
Night trains